The enzyme 3-deoxy-manno-octulosonate-8-phosphatase (EC 3.1.3.45) catalyzes the reaction 

3-deoxy-D-manno-octulosonate 8-phosphate + H2O  3-deoxy-D-manno-octulosonate + phosphate

This enzyme belongs to the family of hydrolases, specifically those acting on phosphoric monoester bonds.  The systematic name is 3-deoxy-D-manno-octulosonate-8-phosphate 8-phosphohydrolase. This enzyme participates in lipopolysaccharide biosynthesis.

References

 

EC 3.1.3
Enzymes of unknown structure